Asahikawa Shrine (旭川神社, Asahikawa jinja) is a Shinto shrine located in Asahikawa, Hokkaido. Established in 1893, it is dedicated to the kami Amaterasu (天照皇大御神) and Konohanasakuyahime no mikoto (木花開耶姫命). Its annual festival is on August 15.

See also
List of Shinto shrines in Hokkaidō

External links
Official website
Hokkaido Shinto listing

Shinto shrines in Hokkaido
1893 establishments in Japan